Brajamohan Jamatia (1905 – 2 March 2012) was an Indian politician. He was born and died in Manu.

Career 
Jamatia was born in a tribal peasant family in southern Tripura. Being illiterate, he came into contact with the Janasiksha Samiti literacy movement. In 1950 he became a member of the Communist Party of India. He was active in the struggle of Ganamukti Parishad, and became a member of the Central Committee of the organization. In the 1964 split in the party, he sided with the Communist Party of India (Marxist). He became a member of the Tripura State Committee of CPI(M).

He was elected to the Tripura Legislative Assembly in 1977 and, again, in 1988.

Jamatia spent several years underground. He was imprisoned eight times. He learned to read and write in prison. In total his jail terms lasted for close to a decade.

References

1905 births
2012 deaths
Communist Party of India (Marxist) politicians from Tripura
Indian centenarians
Men centenarians